Kaozouapa Elizabeth Lee is an American politician serving in the Minnesota House of Representatives since 2023. A member of the Minnesota Democratic-Farmer-Labor Party (DFL), Lee represents District 67A in the Twin Cities metropolitan area, including parts of Saint Paul in Ramsey County, Minnesota.

Early life, career and education 
Lee was raised in public housing on the East Side of Saint Paul, Minnesota. She earned a Bachelor of Arts degree in political science from Yale University. Lee worked as a staffer for Senator Amy Klobuchar, Congresswoman Barbara Lee, and then-Congressman Keith Ellison.

Minnesota House of Representatives 
Lee was elected to the Minnesota House of Representatives in 2022, after defeating incumbent John Thompson in a DFL primary. Lee serves as an assistant majority leader for the House DFL caucus. She serves as vice-chair of the Property Tax Division of the Taxes Committee and sits on the Children and Families Finance and Policy, Education Policy, and Taxes Committees.

Electoral history

Personal life 
Lee lives in Saint Paul, Minnesota.

References 

Living people
Minnesota Democrats
Members of the Minnesota House of Representatives
Women state legislators in Minnesota
Yale University alumni
People from Saint Paul, Minnesota
Politicians from Saint Paul, Minnesota
Year of birth missing (living people)